Irfan Khan (born 2 July 1988) is an Indian first-class cricketer who played for Services. He played in six first-class, ten List A, and twenty-one Twenty20 matches between 2009 and 2016.

References

External links
 

1988 births
Living people
Indian cricketers
Services cricketers
People from Bulandshahr district